Bardem is a Spanish surname of Catalan origin. Notable people with the surname include: 

Carlos Bardem, Spanish actor
Javier Bardem, Spanish actor
Juan Antonio Bardem, Spanish screenwriter and  film director
Mónica Bardem, Spanish actress
Pilar Bardem, Spanish actress
Rafael Bardem, Spanish actor

Surnames
Catalan-language surnames